Mario Cerciello Rega was an Italian police officer. He was murdered on 26 July 2019 by two American students visiting Rome. Deputy Brigadier Rega, age 35, was a member of the Carabinieri, Italy's national military police force.  He was stabbed to death as he investigated a drug deal. Carabinieri Officer Andrea Varriale, Rega's police partner, was injured. In May 2021, two American students from California were found guilty of the murder.  Finnegan Lee Elder, age 19 at the time of the crime, and Gabriel Christian Natale-Hjorth, age 18, were each sentenced to life in prison.

Perpetrators 

Finnegan Lee Elder and Gabriel Christian Natale-Hjorth became friends while attending Tamalpais High School in Mill Valley, California. Elder had previously attended Sacred Heart Cathedral Preparatory in San Francisco, California, but was asked to leave after an altercation with another student.

Killing 
On the night of 25 July, Elder and Natale-Hjorth went to the Trastevere district to buy cocaine. Only Natale-Hjorth could speak Italian. When they realized that the pusher had sold them crushed aspirin, they stole a backpack from Sergio Brugiatelli, who had led them to the dealer. Brugiatelli borrowed a phone and called his own number. The two young men answered, telling him that if he wanted his backpack back, he would have to bring them 100 euros and a gram of cocaine. Brugiatelli called the Carabinieri, telling them he needed his backpack back because it contained his documents. The Carabinieri sent two officers, who went unarmed and in plain street clothes to meet the two men, while Brugiatelli waited nearby. At the meetingplace, Elder stabbed Rega 11 times. The two Americans immediately went back to their hotel, a block away.

See also 

 Crime in Italy
 Law enforcement in Italy

References

Sources 
 

 

 

 

 

 

 

2019 murders in Italy
Murder in Italy
American people imprisoned abroad